Litchfield High School is a coed public high school located in Litchfield, Illinois in Montgomery County, Illinois, in the United States. LHS is a part of Litchfield Community Unit School District #12.

Student organizations & activities

Local Organizations
 Band
 Book club
 Chamber Choir
 Dance team
 Drama club
 Eco team
 Homecoming
 Jazz band
 Pep club
 Prom committees
 Rembrandt Society (Illinois Student Art Association)
 Speech team
 Student Council
 Yearbook

National Organizations
 Family, Career and Community Leaders of America
 Fellowship of Christian Athletes
 Future Farmers of America
 Interact Club
 Key Club
 National Honor Society
 SADD

Interscholastic athletics & activities
Litchfield High School sponsors teams known as the Purple Panthers for boys and Lady Panthers for girls that compete as members of the Illinois High School Association and the South Central Conference. The team colors are purple and white, and the school mascot is a purple panther.

Boys' sports
 Baseball (JV & Varsity)
 Basketball (Freshman, JV & Varsity)
 Cross country
 Football (Frosh-Soph & Varsity)
 Golf
 Soccer
 Track & Field
 Wrestling (JV & Varsity)

Girls' sports
 Basketball (JV & Varsity)
 Cheerleading (JV & Varsity)
 Cross country
 Golf
 Soccer (JV & Varsity)
 Softball (JV & Varsity)
 Track & Field
 Volleyball (JV & Varsity)

Other activities
 Music
 Band
 Chorus
 Scholastic Bowl
 Pop Culture Club

References

External links

Public high schools in Illinois
Schools in Montgomery County, Illinois
Education in Montgomery County, Illinois